Caecum clarkii is a species of minute sea snail, a marine gastropod mollusk or micromollusk in the family Caecidae.

Description
The shell size varies between 1 mm and 2 mm

Distribution
This species is distributed in European waters from the Netherlands to the Azores; in the Mediterranean Sea.

References

 Gofas, S.; Le Renard, J.; Bouchet, P. (2001). Mollusca, in: Costello, M.J. et al. (Ed.) (2001). European register of marine species: a check-list of the marine species in Europe and a bibliography of guides to their identification. Collection Patrimoines Naturels, 50: pp. 180–213 
 e Kluijver, M.J.; Ingalsuo, S.S.; de Bruyne, R.H. (2000). Macrobenthos of the North Sea [CD-ROM]: 1. Keys to Mollusca and Brachiopoda. World Biodiversity Database CD-ROM Series. Expert Center for Taxonomic Identification (ETI): Amsterdam, The Netherlands.

External links
 

Caecidae
Gastropods described in 1859